Zygmunt Pytko (1937–1996) also spelt Zygmunt Pytka was an international speedway rider from Poland.

Speedway career 
Pytko was the champion of Poland, winning the Polish Individual Speedway Championship in 1967.

References 

1937 births
1996 deaths
Polish speedway riders